Hadji Murat is a novella written by Leo Tolstoy from 1896 to 1904 and published posthumously in 1912 (though not in full until 1917). It titular protagonist Hadji Murat is an Avar rebel commander who, for reasons of personal revenge, forges an uneasy alliance with the Russians he has been fighting.

Inspiration
The theme of struggle while remaining faithful resonated with Tolstoy even though he was in ailing health; later letters suggest this work gave him a brief, final moment of vigor. Just as the author was struggling with his near death, his extended meditation on the concept of the individual refusing to give in to the demands of the world helped him to complete the book, although he himself had no inclination to publish it and was only concerned with its completion. In addition to the theme of resistance, there are many other ideas that can be found in the novel, such as determinism; this echoes Tolstoy's major work War and Peace. An even clearer theme is the struggle between a Christian Russia and Muslim Caucasian Imamate, the classic West vs. East theme found in Russian history and many different stories and novels (and which is once again pertinent in light of First and Second Chechen Wars in Chechnya and Russia).

The work is very similar to Alexander Pushkin's historical novel The Captain's Daughter (1836) in that it is a realist work based on actual people and events and has a similar direction, though the main character in this novel does not meet the same end. Tolstoy used material in Russian archives, including Hadji Murad's own account of his life.

Historical context

Tolstoy created this story in reference to the Caucasus Mountains during the mid-nineteenth century in Russia. During this time period, an imperial conquest ensued between the Chechen-Dagestani and the Russian military. The Russian military had expectations to expand upon their empire. Hadji Murat is also linked with Tolstoy's own experiences in the military. He wrote to his brother in 1851: "If you wish to show off with news… you may recount that a certain Hadji Murad [...] surrendered a few days ago to the Russian government. He was the leading dare-devil and ‘brave’ of all Chechnya, but has been led into committing a mean action."

In the book he described the experiences of the Caucasian and Russian struggle that both he and Hadji Murad were caught up in. Although it was written about fifty years after the events of the story actually happened Tolstoy paints a picture of actual Russian civilization at the time. He portrays the differences between the bureaucratic decay and the healthy passionate life of a mountaineer.

Plot summary

The narrator prefaces the story with his comments on a crushed, but still living thistle he finds in a field (a symbol for the main character), after which he begins to tell the story of Hadji Murat, a successful and famed separatist guerrilla who falls out with his own commander and eventually sides with the Russians in hope of saving his family. Hadji Murat's family is being contained and controlled by Imam Shamil, the Avar leader who abducted his mother, two wives, and five children. Aside from the fact that Murat wants to save his family, he additionally wants to avenge the deaths of other family members. The story opens with Murat and two of his followers fleeing from Shamil, the commander of the Caucasian separatists, who is at war with the Russians. They find refuge at the house of Sado, a loyal supporter of Murat. The local people learn of his presence and chase him out of the village.

His lieutenant succeeds in making contact with the Russians, who promise to meet Murat. He eventually arrives at the fortress of Vozdvizhenskaya to join the Russian forces, in hopes of drawing their support in order to overthrow Shamil and save his family. Before his arrival, a small skirmish occurs with some Chechen and Dagestani mountaineers outside the fortress, and Petrukha Avdeyev, a young Russian soldier, dies in a local military hospital after being shot. Tolstoy makes a chapter-length aside about Petrukha: childless, he volunteered as a conscript in place of his brother who had a family of his own. Petrukha's father regrets this because he was a dutiful worker compared to his complacent brother.

While at Vozdvizhenskaya, Murat befriends Prince Semyon Vorontsov, the Viceroy's son, his wife Maria and his son, and wins over the good will of the soldiers stationed there. They are at once in awe of his physique and reputation, and enjoy his company and find him honest and upright. The Vorontsovs give him a present of a watch which fascinates him.
On the fifth day of Murat's stay, the governor-general's adjutant, Mikhail Loris-Melikov arrives with orders to write down Murat's story, and the reader learns some of his history: he was born in the village of Tselmes and early on became close to the local Khans due to his mother being the royal family's wetnurse. When he was fifteen some followers of Muridism came into his village calling for a holy war (ghazavat) against Russia. Murat declines at first but after a learned man is sent to explain how it will be run, he tentatively agrees. However, in their first confrontation, Shamil—then a lieutenant for the Muslims hostile to the Russians—embarrasses Murat when he goes to speak with the leader Gamzat. Gamzat eventually launches an attack on the capital of Khunzakh and kills the pro-Russian khans, taking control of this part of Dagestan. The slaughter of the khans throws Hadji and his brother against Gamzat, and they eventually succeed in tricking and killing him, causing his followers to flee. Unfortunately, Murat's brother is killed in the attempt and Shamil replaces Gamzat as leader. He calls on Murat to join his struggle, but Murat refuses because the blood of his brother and the khans are on Shamil.

Once Murat has joined the Russians, who are aware of his position and bargaining ability, they find him the perfect tool for getting to Shamil. However, Vorontsov's plans are ruined by the War Minister, Chernyshov, a rival prince who is jealous of him, and Murat has to remain in the fortress because the Tsar is told he is possibly a spy. The story digresses into a depiction of the Tsar Nicholas I of Russia, which reveals his lethargic and bitter nature and his egotistical complacency, as well as his contempt towards women, his brother-in-law Frederick William IV of Prussia, and Russian students.

The Tsar orders an attack on the mountaineers and Murat remains in the fortress. Meanwhile, Murat's mother, wife and eldest son Yusuf, whom Shamil hold captive, are moved to a more defensible location. Realizing his position (neither trusted by the Russians to lead an army against Shamil, nor able to return to Shamil because he will be killed), Hadji Murat decides to flee the fortress to gather men to save his family.

At this point the narrative jumps forward in time, to the arrival of a group of soldiers at the fortress bearing Murat's severed head. Maria Dimitriyevna—the companion of one of the officers and a friend of Murat—comments on the cruelty of men during times of war, calling them 'butchers'. The soldiers then tell the story of Murat's death. He had escaped the fortress and shook off his usual Russian escort with the help of his five lieutenants. After they escape they come upon a marsh that they are unable to cross, and hide amongst some bushes until the morning. An old man gives away their position and Karganov, the commander of the fortress, the soldiers, and some Cossacks surround the area. Hadji Murat and his men fortify themselves and begin to fire upon the troops, dying valiantly. Hadji himself runs into fire after his men are killed, despite being wounded and plugging up his fatal wounds in his body with cloth. As he fires his last bullet his life flashes before him and the soldiers think he's dead; he gets up for one final struggle and falls to his death. Victorious, the Russian soldiers fall upon and decapitate him. The nightingales, which stopped singing during the battle, begin again and the narrator ends by recalling the thistle once more.

Character list

 Hadji Murad

The story is about Hadji wrestling with joining the Russians against their Caucasian adversaries to defeat a foe Shamil who captured his mother, wives, and children. He is an Avar Caucasian warrior who was formerly as Russian-appointed governor of Avaria and currently Shamil's chief representative there. Hadji has a very distinct appearance: black eyes, shaved head, sun burned hands, skinny yet muscular arms, and most importantly a limp. Hadji received this limp while he was escaping from Akhmet Khan. He has many different personality traits that range from very intimidating to very kind.

 Shamil

Shamil is the leader of the Caucasian rebels, who is determined to clash with the Russians. He is very tall, powerful and charismatic. He holds Hadji Murat's family and loved ones captive and threatens them so he can draw Hadji to where he is so that he can kill him.

 Prince Mikhail Semenovich Vorontsov

This prince is one of the major commanders of the Russians. His wealth and connections enable him to be a great leader and to get people to follow him. He is vital to the plot because he is the only Russian commander to whom Hadji Murat will submit and listen. Vorontsov does not give Hadji everything that he wants, like trading POWs for his family. However, Vorontsov does let Hadji move freely about Russia in search of his family.

 Petrukha Avdeyev

He is a young Russian soldier who bleeds to death in a local military hospital after being shot in a small skirmish outside the fortress. An entire chapter is dedicated to explaining his life. He has no children and volunteered as a conscript in place of his brother who had a family of his own.

 Nicholas I

A very authoritarian and bitter Tsar of Russia. He is very egotistical and treats women and those who are close to him poorly. This includes Frederick William IV of Prussia and Russian students.

 Maria Dimitriyevna

She befriends Murat and becomes troubled by the cruelty of men during times of war when she sees his severed head. She expresses her feelings towards some soldiers who then told her the story of his death.

Themes
Hadji Murat is very different than the other works Tolstoy produced around the same time. In The Devil (1889), The Kreutzer Sonata (1890), "Father Sergius" (1898), Resurrection (1899), "Master and Man" (1895), and The Forged Coupon (1905), the emphasis is on man's moral duties which is not the case in Hadji Murat. Tolstoy usually has the protagonists go through a process of "purification", where they learn something about an ethical ideal. Hadji Murat is a unique story by Tolstoy because this does not occur. Instead in Tolstoy's old age he returned to writing about memories from his youth. Hadji Murat is a story that consists of negative themes which is unusual for Tolstoy. He portrays the negative side of man doubting that there is goodness in any man at all. Rebecca Ruth Gould has described Hadji Murat along with Tolstoy's other writings on the Caucasus, as "ethnographic footnotes informing the reader about the history, languages, and customs of Russia’s enemies."

Symbolism
The narrator encounters two thistles at the beginning of the story. The first thistle is crimson colored and very prickly, so he has to go around to avoid it. He desperately wants it for his bouquet, but, while he is trying to uproot it, he accidentally destroys its beauty. Shortly afterward, he finds the second thistle, which has been run over and stands half-broken, though it still looks resilient. After the events unfold, Hadji Murat becomes the thistle that grew on Russian soil but is ignored or destroyed.

Reception

Influential American literature critic Harold Bloom said of Hadji Murat: "[it is] my personal touchstone for the sublime of prose fiction, to me the best story in the world."

Editions and translations
Over 250 editions of Hadji Murat have been published since 1912. Translations into English include those by 
Kyril Zinovieff and Jenny Hughes (2015) for Alma Publications, Pevear and Volokhonsky's 2009 translation, David McDuff (2006) and Paul Foote (1977) now in Penguin Classics plus the commonly reprinted 1912 version by Aylmer Maude. This has been available since 2003 with an introduction by Azar Nafisi. The Pevear and Volokhonsky's edition was chosen by Boyd Tonkin as his selection for the BBC Radio 4 show A Good Read on Friday 4 December 2020.

Several editions combine Hadji Murat with the early Tolstoy novel The Cossacks and sometimes also with the 1852-3 story The Raid, all set in the Caucasus during the period of Russia's consolidation of power in the 19th century.

See also

Leo Tolstoy bibliography

References

External links
 English Text
 Hadji Murad, at RevoltLib.com
 Hadji Murad, at Marxists.org
 Hadji Murat, at TheAnarchistLibrary.org
 
 Commentary
 Chechnya's Favorite Russian: Leo Tolstoy 
 Next Up for WSJ Book Club: Leo Tolstoy 

1904 Russian novels
1912 Russian novels
Novellas by Leo Tolstoy
Novels published posthumously